John James Kinley (October 15, 1881 – August 23, 1971) was an industrialist, pharmaceutical chemist, journalist, ship owner and political figure in Nova Scotia, Canada. He represented Lunenburg County in the Nova Scotia House of Assembly from 1916 to 1925 and from 1928 to 1930 and Queens—Lunenburg in the House of Commons of Canada from 1935 to 1945 as a Liberal member. Kinley sat for Queens-Lunenburg division in the Senate of Canada from 1945 to 1971.

Early life and education
He was born in Lunenburg, Nova Scotia, the son of Captain James Francis Kinley and Louisa Annette Loye. He was educated at the Lunenburg County Academy.

Career
Kinley worked with druggist E. L. Nash for a number of years before establishing his own business Kinley Drug Company in Lunenburg in 1900. In 1912, he opened a second drug store in Halifax with his brother as partner. He married Lila Evelyn Dowling Young in 1920. John James and Lila had three children, Mary, John James Junior and James Edward. Kinley was the youngest mayor of the town of Lunenburg from 1911 to 1913. He was president of the Lunenburg Foundry Company Ltd. Kinley was a minister without portfolio in the province's Executive Council from 1923 to 1925. He served during World War I and was awarded the King Haakon VII Freedom Cross by King Haakon VII for distinguished service to Norway during World War II. Kinley ran unsuccessfully for a seat in the House of Commons in 1930.

Personal life
His son, James Kinley, served as Lieutenant Governor of Nova Scotia from 1994 to 2000.

References 
 
 A Directory of the Members of the Legislative Assembly of Nova Scotia, 1758-1958, Public Archives of Nova Scotia (1958)

1881 births
1971 deaths
Nova Scotia Liberal Party MLAs
Members of the House of Commons of Canada from Nova Scotia
Liberal Party of Canada MPs
Canadian senators from Nova Scotia
Mayors of places in Nova Scotia